Mazaj (also Romanized as Mazj; also known as Magās, Maghāzu, and Maghz) is a village in Kalat-e Hay-ye Gharbi Rural District, Bastam District, Shahrud County, Semnan Province, Iran. At the 2006 census, its population was 666, in 215 families.

References 

Populated places in Shahrud County